Olney is a census-designated place and unincorporated community in Flathead County, Montana, United States. Its population was 191 as of the 2010 census. Olney has a post office with ZIP code 59927.  The most recent 2020 census states the population is 146 according to census.gov.   The community is located along U.S. Route 93.

The post office opened in 1907.

It is near Lower Stillwater Lake.

Demographics

References

Census-designated places in Flathead County, Montana
Unincorporated communities in Flathead County, Montana